New Farakka Junction is a railway station on the Howrah–New Jalpaiguri line and is located in Jangipur district in the Indian state of West Bengal. New Farakka Junction railway station lies south of the Farakka Barrage.

Farakka Barrage
The  Farakka Barrage carries a rail-cum-road bridge across the Ganges. The rail bridge was thrown open to the public in 1971, thereby linking the towns of Murshidabad district to Malda, New Jalpaiguri and other railway stations in North Bengal.

Trains
Number of halting trains: 87

 12041/12042 New Jalpaiguri–Howrah Shatabdi Express
 12516/12517 Silchar-Coimbatore Superfast Express
 13149/13150 Alipurduar-Sealdah Kanchankanya Express
 12507/12508 Silchar-Thiruvananthapuram Aronai Superfast Express
 12513/12514 Guwahati–Secunderabad Express
 12509/12510 Guwahati-Bangaluru Cantt. Kaziranga Superfast Express
 15929/15930 Dibrugarh–Tambaram Express
 14055/14056 Kamakhya-Delhi Brahmaputra Mail
 15629/15630 Tambaram-Silghat Town Nagaon Express
 15647/15648 Lokmanya Tilak Terminus–Guwahati Express (via Malda Town)
 15661/15662 Ranchi–Kamakhya Express
 12345/12346 Guwahati-Howrah Saraighat Superfast Express
 25657/25658 Sealdah–Silchar Kanchanjunga Express
 15659/15660 Sealdah–Agartala Kanchanjunga Express
 15959/15960 Dibrugarh-Howrah Kamrup Express via Guwahati
 15961/15962 Dibrugarh–Howrah Kamrup Express Via Rangapara North
 13147/13148 Bamanhat-Sealdah Uttar Banga Express
 15639/15640 Puri–Kamakhya Express (via Adra)
 15643/15644 Puri–Kamakhya Express (via Howrah)
 15619/15620 Kamakhya–Gaya Express
 13141/13142 New Alipurduar-Sealdah Teesta Torsa Express
 13145/13146 Kolkata–Radhikapur Express
 13163/13164 Saharsa-Sealdah Hate Bazare Express
 13159/13160 Kolkata–Jogbani Express
 13425/13426 Surat–Malda Town Express
 13011/13012 Howrah–Malda Town Intercity Express
 13465/13466 Howrah–Malda Town Intercity Express (via Azimganj)
 13161/13162 Balurghat-Kolkata Tebhaga Express
 13153/13154 Malda-Kolkata Gour Express
 13413/13414 Malda-Delhi Farakka Express
 13483/13484 Farakka Express (via Faizabad)
 13415/13416 Malda Town–Patna Express
 15941/15942 Jhajha–Dibrugarh Weekly Express
 13421/13422 Nabadwip Dham–Malda Town Express
 14003/14004 Malda Town–New Delhi Express
 13417/13418 Digha–Malda Town Express
 13063/13064 Howrah–Balurghat Bi-Weekly Express
 13409/13410 Malda Town–Jamalpur Intercity Express
 13033/13034 Katihar–Howrah Express
 53027/53028 Malda Town–Azimganj Passenger
 53417/53418 Malda Town–Barddhaman Passenger
 03427/03428 Malda Town–Haridwar Special Fare Special Express
 53401/53402 Malda Town–Sahibganj Passenger

References

Railway stations in Murshidabad district
Railway junction stations in West Bengal
Railway stations opened in 1971
1971 establishments in West Bengal
Malda railway division